NCPHS may refer to:

National Commission for the Protection of Human Subjects of Biomedical and Behavioral Research, established on July 12, 1974 (see Tuskegee Syphilis Study)
North Carolina Postal History Society http://ncpostalhistory.com/
Northside College Preparatory High School
Northern California Presbyterian Homes and Services of senior housing and services for the San Francisco Bay Area.